Nicolás Andrés Maná (born 25 March 1994) is an Argentine professional footballer who plays as a right winger for Montevideo Wanderers.

Career
Boca Juniors were Maná's first senior club, he remained with them for three years but didn't make a first-team appearance; though was an unused substitute on two occasions during the 2012–13 Argentine Primera División season. In January 2015, Peruvian Primera División side Universidad San Martín loaned Maná. He made his debut during a Copa Inca fixture with Juan Aurich on 7 February. His first league appearance arrived on 2 May versus FBC Melgar, which was followed by his first goal against Ayacucho in November 2015. In all competitions, Maná featured thirty-seven times for the club.

Maná signed for Primera C Metropolitana's Cañuelas in June 2016, but was immediately signed on loan by San Martín of the Argentine Primera División. He netted his opening goal in the Argentine top-flight on 27 May 2017 in a 4–2 victory over Sarmiento. 2018 saw Maná leave San Martín following two seasons on loan, returning to Cañuelas though immediately departing the club permanently to join Superleague Greece side Panetolikos. He scored his first goal in a draw against Lamia on 24 September, prior to netting a brace in a game against Atromitos months later. He was released in May 2019.

On 1 July 2019, Maná moved to Defensa y Justicia on a free transfer. After a few loan spells and a total of nine appearances for Defensa, Maná left the club at the end of 2021 and then joined Paraguayan club Sol de América in January 2022. On 29 July 2022, Maná joined Uruguayan club Montevideo Wanderers.

Career statistics
.

References

External links

1994 births
Living people
Sportspeople from Buenos Aires Province
Argentine footballers
Association football forwards
Argentine expatriate footballers
Argentine Primera División players
Peruvian Primera División players
Primera C Metropolitana players
Super League Greece players
Paraguayan Primera División players
Boca Juniors footballers
Club Deportivo Universidad de San Martín de Porres players
Cañuelas footballers
San Martín de San Juan footballers
Panetolikos F.C. players
Defensa y Justicia footballers
Club Guaraní players
Vila Nova Futebol Clube players
Club Sol de América footballers
Montevideo Wanderers F.C. players
Expatriate footballers in Peru
Expatriate footballers in Greece
Expatriate footballers in Paraguay
Expatriate footballers in Brazil
Argentine expatriate sportspeople in Peru
Argentine expatriate sportspeople in Greece
Argentine expatriate sportspeople in Paraguay
Argentine expatriate sportspeople in Brazil